The 2002 Big Sky Conference men's basketball tournament was held March 7–9 at the Brick Breeden Fieldhouse at Montana State University in Bozeman, Montana.

Fourth-seeded  upset second-seeded  in the championship game, 70–66, to win their fourth Big Sky men's basketball tournament title.

The Grizzlies, in turn, received an automatic bid to the 2002 NCAA tournament. No other Big Sky members were invited this year.

Format
Cal State Northridge departed the Big Sky for the Big West prior to the 2001–02 season, decreasing total membership back to eight.

Nonetheless, no changes were made to the existing tournament format. Only the top six teams from the regular season conference standings were invited to the tournament. The two top teams were given byes into the semifinals while the third- through sixth-seeded teams were placed and paired into the preliminary quarterfinal round. Following the quarterfinals, the two victorious teams were re-seeded for the semifinal round, with the lowest-seeded remaining team paired with the tournament's highest seed and vis-versa for the other.

Bracket

See also
Big Sky Conference women's basketball tournament

References

Big Sky Conference men's basketball tournament
Tournament
Big Sky Conference men's basketball tournament
Big Sky Conference men's basketball tournament
Basketball competitions in Montana
Sports in Bozeman, Montana
College sports tournaments in Montana